Agromyces neolithicus is a Gram-negative bacterium from the genus of Agromyces which has been isolated from soil from the Porto Badisco in Italy.

References 

Microbacteriaceae
Bacteria described in 2005